Ruth is a four-piece Christian indie band from Battle Ground, Washington. Ruth's debut album, Secondhand Dreaming, was released June 26, 2007.

History

Formation
Dustin Ruth moved to Los Angeles to find band members to join him in forming a band. After searching for some time, he finally found a group of people in his hometown of Portland, Oregon, who also wanted to form a band. The band's name "Ruth" is a reference to the lead singer's last name, and is also an acronym for "Return Us to Him".

In early 2006, they released a self-titled EP and promoted their music by playing concerts along the West Coast of the United States. They were signed on by Tooth & Nail Records in fall 2006, and began recording their full-length debut album.

Secondhand Dreaming
In November 2006, they finished recording their debut album, Secondhand Dreaming, with producer Aaron Sprinkle. It was subsequently released on June 26, 2007, and Ruth supported the album while on tour with label mates Emery and Surrogate. In late 2007, Ruth embarked on the "Appetite for Construction Tour" with Switchfoot and Relient K, a tour which supported the charity Habitat For Humanity.

Anorak
Following the release of Secondhand Dreaming, the band began recording their second album Anorak in early 2008. They worked with Chris Keene of Surrogate as the album's producer, as well as Aaron Sprinkle again. The recording was completed in May 2008, and the album was released on October 28, 2008, in the United States.

The Covers EP
In April 2009, Ruth toured with Falling Up on their Fangs! tour.

On August 25, 2009, Ruth digitally released a five-song EP covering artists such as Coldplay, Tracy Chapman, Buddy Holly, Mr. Big, and the Everly Brothers. The first song to be released was the cover of Coldplay's "Fix You".

As of January 13, 2010, Ruth was no longer signed to Tooth & Nail. The band is still active, but is currently independent.

Payola 
In November 2011, they released a video of a new song, "Life is Just a Dream".

This song was included in Ruth's album Payola, released on March 6, 2012, in partnership with MTV.

Philanthropic 
All proceeds from the song "Rosa Dear" during the month of February 2016 were donated to Vet Ranch, a foundation that uses user-donated funds to help treat and care for animals (usually those on the brink of being euthanized).

Members

Current members
 Dustin Ruth — lead singer, guitar, harmonica
 Nicholas Wiinikka – lead guitar
 Jesse Counts – bass
 Ryan Peterson – drums

Former members
 Matt Roberts – drums
 Daniel Passera – drums
 Justin Schiermeister – bass
 Brett Van Liew – bass
 Reid VanAtta – drums
 Cody Ray Thompson – drums

Discography

Albums
 Voilà – (2014)
 Payola – In Partnership with MTV (2012)
 The Covers EP – Tooth & Nail Records (2009)
 Anorak – Tooth & Nail Records (2008)
 Secondhand Dreaming – Tooth & Nail Records (2007)
 Ruth EP – independent (2006)

Singles
2007: "Cross the Line"
2007: "You Are", No. 16 on the R&R magazine November 17, 2007 chart
2008: "One Foot In, One Foot Out"
2008: "Back to the Five"

TV and multimedia placements
Vet Ranch (YouTube)
 Rosa Dear
Happy Endings (ABC)
 You've Changed

Fox Family Countdown (FOX)
 Back to the Five

Teen Mom 2 (MTV)
 My One and Only

Punk'd (MTV)
 You've Changed

10 on Top (MTV)
 Life Is Just A Dream
 Alone

Friendzone (MTV)
 My One And Only
 Summer Fire
 Darling Why?
 Alone
 You've Changed
  
Made (MTV)
 My One and Only
  
The Real World: St. Thomas (MTV)
 My One and Only
 Life Is Just A Dream
  
Underemployed (MTV)
 Love & Craigslist

I'm Married To A... (VH1)
 Life Is Just A Dream

My Big Redneck Vacation (CMT)
 Love & Craigslist

Sell This House Extreme (A&E)
 Darling Why?
 
KTLA (KTLA)
 Summer Fire

References

External links
 

Christian rock groups from Washington (state)
Tooth & Nail Records artists
Musical groups established in 2005
2005 establishments in Washington (state)